The 2019 Judo Oceania Open Perth was a judo competition held in Jolimont, Australia from 3 to 4 November 2019. This event was for this year special included in the 2019 IJF World Tour and valued in points as a IJF Grand Prix.

Medal summary

Men's events

Women's events

Source results

Medal table

References

External links
 

2019 IJF World Tour
2019 Judo Grand Prix
November 2019 sports events in Australia
Oceania Open 2019
Sports competitions in Perth, Western Australia
Judo